Sheikh Abul Hossain is a Jatiya Party (Ershad) politician and the former Member of Parliament of Khulna-1.

Career
Hossain was elected to parliament from Khulna-1 as a Jatiya Party candidate in 1988.

References

Jatiya Party politicians
Living people
4th Jatiya Sangsad members
People from Khulna District
Year of birth missing (living people)